Tomb of Tahir Khan Nahar (or Tahar Khan Nahar) is situated at Seet pur, Muzaffargarh, Pakistan. This tomb is protected by the Federal Government of Pakistan.
The tomb of Tahir Khan Nahar situated in central Sitpur (Seetpur), a town in southern Punjab near the confluence of the Indus River and Chenab River. Tahir Khan Nahar built the present tomb and mosque at seetpur in his lifetime, at the close of fifteenth century A.D. The tomb of Tahir Khan Nahar bears very close resemblance with the Tomb of Shah Rukn-e-Alam at Multan that was built around 1320.

The tomb of Tashir Khan is three stories.

Tahir Khan  was the famous chief of a vast territory around Sitpur at that time.

References

Muzaffargarh
 
Buildings and structures in Muzaffargarh